The Bara Pulah Bridge or BaraPullah Bridge is a busy road-passing in Delhi, near Humayun's Tomb and Khan-i-Khana's Tomb. It is surrounded by the fruit and vegetable market behind the Nizamuddin railway station. Due to the increasing population and traffic problems, the government announced a new Barapullah Elevated Road project during the Delhi Commonwealth Games. The new overpass bridge has marginally solved the traffic problems, but has overshadowed the historic bridge which is now almost invisible and overrun by squatters. The BaraPullah Bridge is a monument of national importance and protected by the Archaeological Survey of India.

History 
The BaraPullah bridge was built by Minar Banu Agha nearly 400 years ago. According to historians, the bridge was built under Jahangir's rule and personally commissioned by him. The Mughals used the bridge to cross the Yamuna river to reach Nizamuddin Dargah and Humayun's Tomb while returning from Agra. In 1628 the road between the bridge and Humayun's Tomb was a wide tree-lined path and was considered the most beautiful bridge of Delhi.

Architecture 

References

External links 
Indira Gandhi National Centre for Arts/Barapullah Bridge

Bridges in Delhi
Bridges completed in the 17th century
17th-century establishments in India
Monuments of National Importance in Delhi